Hugo Nicholson (December 21, 1898 – August 28, 1972) was an American painter. His work was part of the painting event in the art competition at the 1932 Summer Olympics.

References

1898 births
1972 deaths
20th-century American painters
American male painters
Olympic competitors in art competitions
People from McKean County, Pennsylvania
20th-century American male artists